Analog Man is the eleventh and latest solo studio album by the American singer-songwriter and multi-instrumentalist Joe Walsh, formerly of the James Gang and lead guitarist for the Eagles. The album was released in mid 2012, on the label Fantasy in the United States and the United Kingdom, It is also his first new solo studio album to be released since 1992's Songs for a Dying Planet, 20 years prior. The album features 10 new songs, and was co-produced by Jeff Lynne. The album also features contributions from the former Beatles drummer, Ringo Starr, the former Barnstorm members, Kenny Passarelli and Joe Vitale, former James Gang members, Jim Fox and Dale Peters, and also a duet with Little Richard.

The album peaked at No. 12 on the Billboard 200 chart, as well as No. 4 on the top rock albums chart. In the UK it reached No. 53, his first chart album there for 34 years.

Production and recording
After touring with the Eagles and struggling with alcohol and drug addictions for many years, Walsh decided that it was time to record a new album while being supported by his wife, Marjorie Bach (sister of Ringo Starr's wife, Barbara). To pursue making the album, she also gave Walsh Jeff Lynne's contact number.
When Walsh was asked about his collaboration with co-producer Jeff Lynne, he said "Jeff and I met socially, and at one point he said, "Why don't you bring your tracks over sometime and we'll have a listen." That led to some comments and ideas that he had. Gradually, we worked on some stuff and checked out some of his stuff too. It ended up that he really helped me finish it up and ended up producing. He really put his stamp on my music and took it in a direction I never would have gone, and I'm really grateful to him."

Critical reception

The album received mixed reviews, with review aggregator Metacritic assigning an overall rating of 57/100. Reviewing the album in Rolling Stone, critic Jon Dolan wrote of the album "life's clearly been pretty good to Walsh: He's sober ("One Day at a Time"), loves his family ("Family") and still has good command of his guitar chops (check out "Funk 50," a reinvention of the James Gang's 1970 killer "Funk #49," complete with new, carefree lyrics)."

Reviewing for AllMusic, critic Stephen Thomas Erlewine wrote of the album "apart from the odd lyrical reference to an iPod or Walsh's ongoing recovery, Analog Man sounds like it could have come out in 1992 and that's all due to Lynne, a man who makes a record in one particular way: crisp, clean, hook-laden, and sequenced so tightly there's no room to breathe."

Track listing
All songs written by Joe Walsh, except as noted.

Vinyl LP Track listing
All songs written by Joe Walsh, except as noted.

Personnel 
 Joe Walsh – guitars, lead vocals (1-4, 6, 7, 8, 11), vocals (5, 9), bass (5, 7, 10), drums (5), acoustic piano (7), string arrangements (7), synthesizers (10), backing vocals (12)
 Jeff Lynne – keyboards (1, 2), guitars (1, 2, 8), bass (1, 2, 4, 8), drums (1, 2, 4, 8), backing vocals (2, 4, 8)
 Bruce Sugar – organ (3), percussion programming (6), programming (10, 11)
 Joe Vitale – keyboards (6), sitar (6)
 Richard Davis – synthesizers (7), programming (7)
 Little Richard – acoustic piano (12), lead vocals (12)
 Greg Leisz – pedal steel guitar (3)
 Jay Dee Maness – pedal steel guitar (3)
 Tim Armstrong – guitars (9)
 Rick Rosas – bass (3)
 Kenny Passarelli – bass (6)
 Dale Peters – bass (12)
 Ringo Starr – drums (3, 6)
 Jim Fox – drums (12), backing vocals (12)
 Steve Jay – percussion (1, 2, 4)
 Tommy Lee James – backing vocals (3, 6)
 David Crosby – backing vocals (7)
 Graham Nash – backing vocals (7)

Production 
 Jeff Lynne – producer (1, 2, 4, 8, 11), mixing (1, 2, 4, 8, 11)
 Joe Walsh – producer (3, 5, 6, 7, 9, 10)
 Tim Armstrong – producer (9)
 Steve Jay – engineer (1, 2, 4, 8)
 Bruce Sugar – engineer (3, 5, 6, 7, 9, 10), mixing (3, 5, 6, 7, 9, 10, 12)
 John Morrical – producer (9)
 Ken Hammon – engineer (12)
 Dan Gerbarg – mastering 
 Howie Weinberg – mastering 
 Jeri Heiden – art direction 
 Ryan Corey – package design, background photography 
 Andrew MacPherson – photography 
 Irving Azoff – manager for Azoff Management (Los Angeles, CA)

See also
 List of albums released in 2012
 Joe Walsh's discography

References

External links

Joe Walsh albums
2012 albums
Albums produced by Jeff Lynne
Albums produced by Joe Walsh
Fantasy Records albums